Statistics of Swedish football Division 3 for the 1934–35 season.

League standings

Uppsvenska Östra 1934–35

Uppsvenska Västra 1934–35

Östsvenska 1934–35

Mellansvenska 1934–35

Nordvästra 1934–35

Södra Mellansvenska 1934–35

Sydöstra 1934–35

Västsvenska Norra 1934–35

Västsvenska Södra 1934–35

Sydsvenska 1934–35

Footnotes

References 

Swedish Football Division 3 seasons
3
Sweden